Darj-e Olya (also Romanized as Dārj-e ‘Olyā and Dāraj-e ‘Olyā; also known as Dārīj-e Bālā, Dāraj-e Bālā, Darj Bālā, and Qal‘eh Dārīj Bāla) is a village in Zirkuh Rural District, Central District, Zirkuh County, South Khorasan Province, Iran. At the 2006 census, its population was 98, in 25 families.

References 

Populated places in Zirkuh County